Francis Henry "Frank" Coombs (24 April 1925 – April 1998) is a former professional footballer. Coombs was born in East Ham, Essex and played as a goalkeeper for Football League clubs Bristol City, Southend United and Colchester United. He died in 1998.

References

External links

Frank Coombs Career Stats at coludata.co.uk

1925 births
1998 deaths
English footballers
Association football goalkeepers
Footballers from East Ham
Colchester United F.C. players
Southend United F.C. players
Bristol City F.C. players
Dartford F.C. players
Ebbsfleet United F.C. players